Vijay P. Singh (born July 15, 1946) is a Distinguished Professor and a Regents Professor, and holds the Caroline and William N. Lehrer Distinguished Chair in Water Engineering at Texas A&M University. His research interests include Surface-water Hydrology, Groundwater Hydrology, Hydraulics, Irrigation Engineering, Environmental Quality, and Water Resources.

Birth and education 
Vijay P. Singh was born in Agra, India in 1946. He graduated with a BS in Engineering and Technology with emphasis on Soil and Water Conservation Engineering from U.P. Agricultural University, India in 1967. He earned an MS in Engineering with specialization in Hydrology from University of Guelph, Canada in 1970 and a Ph.D. in Civil Engineering with specialization in Hydrology and Water Resources from Colorado State University, Fort Collins, USA in 1974. He also earned a D.Sc. from the University of the Witwatersrand, Johannesburg, South Africa in 1998.

He was elected a member of the National Academy of Engineering (NAE) in 2022 for his contributions to wave modeling and development of entropy-based theories of hydrologic processes and hydroclimatic extremes .

External links
Department of Biological & Agricultural Engineering, TAMU

Texas A&M University faculty
American hydrologists
1946 births
American people of Indian descent
Living people